LAH may refer to:
 Last Action Hero, a 1993 American action-comedy film
 Left anterior hemiblock, a cardiovascular disease
 Leigh Ann Hester, an American soldier during the Iraq War who was awarded the Silver Star medal
 Licentiate of Apothecaries' Hall, a medical qualification awarded in Dublin, Ireland until 1968
 Lithium aluminum hydride, an inorganic compound used as a reducing agent
 1st SS Panzer Division Leibstandarte SS Adolf Hitler, Adolf Hitler's bodyguard unit which eventually grew into an elite Waffen-SS division during World War II
 Lord Alfred Hayes, English professional wrestler, manager and commentator, best known for his appearances in the United States with the World Wrestling Federation between 1982 and 1995.